Lhünzhub County, also called Lhundrub or Linzhou County, is a county in Lhasa towards the north-east of the main center of Chengguan, Tibet, China.
The southern portion, the Pengbo River Valley, contains fertile arable land, while the colder and more mountainous northern portion primarily supports grazing. The county has many monasteries, including the Reting Monastery.

Geography and climate

It includes the Pengbo River Valley and the upper reaches of the Lhasa River.
Mineral resources include lead, zinc, copper, silver, gold and gypsum.
A spur of the Nyainqêntanglha mountains crosses the whole territory, dividing it into a southern and northern part.

Wildlife includes roe deer, white-lipped deer, otter, black-necked crane, duck, Mongolian gazelle, ibex.
Medicinal plants and fungi include Cordyceps, Fritillaria, Rhodiola, and Ganoderma lucidum.

Town and townships

The county was established as Lhünzhub Dzong in 1857. In 1959, it merged with Pundo Dzong to form the modern Lhünzhub County.
As of 2000 Lhünzhub County has jurisdiction over one town, Lhünzhub, and 9 townships.

 Ganden Chökhor (Lhünzhub) Town (()
 Codoi Township
 Karze Township
 Qangka Township
 Sumchêng Township
 Jangraxa Township
 Banjorling Township
 Pundo Township
 Ngarnang Township
 Tanggo Township

Other settlements
Zhujia (朱加)

Economy

As of 2000 the county had a total population of 50,895, of which 8,111 lived in a community designated as urban. 2,254 had non-agricultural registration and 48,362 had agricultural registration.
Crops include barley, winter wheat, spring wheat, canola and vegetables such as potato.
The total output in 1999 was 57,600 tons of grain.

Livestock includes yak, sheep, goats and horses.
Crop residues are used for winter and spring feed. In 1996 more than 85% of winter and spring feed was straw, mostly barley straw.
Linzhou county has been a leading testing and manufacturing center for frozen yak semen, and a center for selective breeding of yaks.
Local enterprises prepare Tibetan medicinal plants and process wood products.
Ethnic handicrafts are well developed, including weaving and mats.
The Pengbo valley has a long history of pottery-making. Products include braziers, flower pots, vases, jugs and so on.

In 2010 the county had a GDP of 839 million yuan, and government revenue was 26.9 million yuan.
Investment in fixed assets was 450 million yuan, excluding water conservancy.
The per capita income of farmers and herdsmen was 4,587 yuan.
Mining was an important source of income, and the government had plans to more actively promote tourism.

Infrastructure

Hutoushan Reservoir lies in Qangka Township.
The reservoir is bordered by large swamps and wet meadows, and has abundant plants and shellfish.
Endangered Black-necked cranes migrate to the middle and southern part of Tibet every winter, and may be seen on the reservoir.

There is a small hydropower station in Lhünzhub town.
The Pangduo Hydro Power Station became operational in 2014.
The reservoir holds  of water.
The power station has total installed capacity of 160 MW, with four generating units.
It has been called the "Tibetan Three Gorges".

The county has a radio and television station. TV coverage is received by 72.1% of the population, and radio by 83.4% of the population. 
The county has 23 health care establishments, including a County People's Hospital with 30 beds. 
By the end of 2000 there were 122 medical personnel.

Religion

The county is a center of Tibetan Buddhism.
There are thirty-seven gompas including twenty-five lamaseries with 919 monks and twelve nunneries with 844 nuns as of 2011. The breakdown by sect is twenty-six Gelug, six Kagyu and five Sakya.

Reting Monastery is located in  Lhünzhub County and was built in 1056 by Dromtön (1005–1064), a student of Atiśa.
It was the earliest monastery of the Gedain sect, and the patriarchal seat of that sect.
In 1240 a Mongol force sacked the monastery and killed 500 people. The gompa was rebuilt. 
When the Gedain sect joined the Gelug sect in the 16th century the monastery adopted the reincarnation system.
The incarnations are named Reting Rimpoche.
Following an attempted rebellion against the Lhasa government in 1947 Reting was imprisoned in the Potala.
After he died in May 1947 the monastery was looted and then razed.
In recent years a lot of reconstruction work has been done. About 160 monks reside in Reting.

References

Sources

External links
 Lhünzhub County Annals